Caroline Kent (born 1975) is an American visual artist based in Chicago, best known for her large scale abstract works. Inspired by her own personal experiences and her cultural heritage, Kent creates paintings that explore the power and limitations of communication.

Biography
Caroline Kent was born in Sterling, Illinois, United States. There she grew up with her mother, father, older sister Angela, and twin sister Christine. Her mother, a Mexican homemaker, and her father, an African American accountant, highly influenced Kent's work ethic. A self-described Midwesterner, Kent spent her summers growing up working summer jobs detasseling corn and dreaming of a greater life outside the borders of her small town. Caroline Kent was very close to her twin sister, Christine Leventhal, growing up. The two shared a unique method of communication which has been highly influential in Kent's artwork. Kent grew up immersed in a language of abstraction. In 1993, Kent left her hometown of Sterling to attend Illinois State University on an athletic scholarship for track and field. Previously, Kent had demonstrated little interest in art but found herself passing her time in the campus gallery. Here, her early inspirations included the art of Russian Constructivists and foreign films. Kent became mesmerized by the universality of the visual language found in art, discovering that on a canvas everyone had the same starting point, without having to pass through linguistic barriers. After her graduation in 1998, Kent joined the Peace Corps, where she lived and worked in Transylvania, Romania for two years. Here, Kent found herself inspired by the multitude of pastel colors that would later play an important part in some of her most well known works. After the Peace Corps, Kent resided in Minneapolis for 15 years,. She has also worked as an assistant professor of Art, Theory, and Practice at Northwestern University. In 2017, Kent moved to West Side Chicago, where she currently lives and works as an artist and mother of three. Kent is represented by Kohn Gallery in Los Angeles and Patron Gallery in Chicago.

Artwork
Caroline Kent's artwork consists of large scale, abstract paintings on canvas. Her work is influenced heavily by her rich Mexican heritage and her personal experiences with language and textual translation, deriving from personal experiences with her twin sister. These cultural references and personal experiences combine in Kent's work to depict a new form of communication, exploring both the powers and limitations of language. Her abstract paintings communicate how visual language can be understood in expanded forms, through both two dimensional abstract paintings and three dimensional timed based performances.

Kent draws influence for her artwork from her Mexican heritage. The "bold spontaneity" and rich "structuralist dynamics" of Mexican artists such has Pedro Coronel and Luis Barragán have played a role in the large scale works full of color and texture created by Kent. Her visit to Casa Luis Barragan in Mexico City was very impactful on her series Victoria/Vernica: The figment between us. Through exploring her Mexican heritage in her art, Kent has been able to participate in a discourse of abstraction that has historically marginalized artists of color. The interaction with nature that is emphasized by Mexican artists has also played a role in influencing the pastel colors and organic shapes that appear in Kent's abstract works.

Kent's most well known series is entitled Victoria/Veronica: The figment between us. This series draws on Kent's personal experience as a twin as the fictional framework for the imaginary twins in the exhibition. Named for her mothers first two names, the series references communication and "telepathic correspondence" between a set of fictional twins. The exhibit explores how unspoken language can operate between sisters. Eight of these large scale abstract paintings were featured in her exhibition A Sudden Appearance of the Sun at Kohn Gallery. In these works, Kent uses geometry, color, and pattern as lines of communication. The exhibit explores questions surrounding how language structures our world and society, while encouraging visitors to engage with the invented language of abstraction, which often defies easy interpretation. The large black backgrounds on the canvases in this series are meant to evoke "cosmic unknowns", serving as a metaphor for "undefiable, unlocatable spaces". Meanwhile the pastel shapes represent things that may have once been covered in darkness but are now illuminated. This series of works is influenced by Swedish artist Hilma af Klint. 

Caroline Kent's earlier works, known as her "typewriter works" also deal with the abstraction of language. These smaller works, done on paper, feature an abstract painting over text resulting from feeding the paper through an old typewriter. These pieces allow the viewer to attempt to understand the relationship between the text and abstract painted forms. Here, the filling in of missing information mirrors communication and human connection.

Kent also has a unique methodology behind creating her abstract works. She allows experimentation and improvisation to direct her painting process by leaning into the logics and practice of intuition. Kent creates mock ups of her paintings by rotating and moving pieces of paper cut into abstract shapes before finalizing the images in paint on the canvas. This method is similar to Matisse's approach to painting.

Education
 1998 Concentration in Art, Illinois State University
 2008 MFA Department of Art, University of Minnesota

Solo exhibitions
2022 (forthcoming): 
 PATRON, Chicago
2021: 
 Victoria/Veronica: Making Rooms, Museum of Contemporary Art, Chicago, IL 
 What the stars can't tell us, University Galleries, Illinois State University, Normal, IL 
 Proclamations from the deep, Casey Kaplan Gallery, New York, NY 
2020: 
 A Sudden Appearance of the Sun, Kohn Gallery, Los Angeles, CA 
  Victoria/Veronica: The figment between us, Tiger Strikes Asteroid, Chicago, IL 
Writing Forms, Hawthorne Contemporary, Milwaukee, WI 
A form that walks toward you in the dark, TCNJ Art Gallery, College of New Jersey, Ewing, NJ 
2018: 
Beyond The Kármán Line, Catherine G. Murphy Gallery, Saint Paul, MN 
How Objects Move Through Walls, Company Projects, Minneapolis, MN 
Disappearance of the word, Appearance of the world, Union for Contemporary Art, Omaha, NE 
2016: 
Joyful is the Dark, Public Functionary, Minneapolis, MN 
2014: 
When You’re Not Looking, I’m Loving You, Johnson Gallery, Bethel University, St. Paul, MN 
The Height of Fiction, Nemeth Art Center, Park Rapids, MN 
2013: 
How I tell it to myself, Elephant, Los Angeles, CA 
St. Wilma and the 4th Dimension, Juxtaposition Arts Gallery, Minneapolis, MN 
2010: 
Romanian Palimpsest, Rochester Art Center, Rochester, MN

Awards and residencies
2020
Joan Mitchell Foundation, Painters and Sculptors Grant, New York, NY 
Artadia Chicago Award, New York, NY 

2018
Paint School Fellowship, Shandaken: Projects, New York, NY 
Artist in Residence, Saint Catherine University, Saint Paul, MN 

2016
McKnight Fellowship for Visual Arts, Minneapolis College of Art and Design, Minneapolis, MN 

2015
Pollock-Krasner Foundation Grant, Pollock-Krasner Foundation, New York, NYArtist 
Initiative Grant, Minnesota State, Mankato, MN 

2013
Creative City Making Grant, Minneapolis, MN 

2011
Artist Initiative Grant, Minnesota State, Mankato, MN 

2009
Jerome Hill Artist Fellowship, Jerome Foundation, St. Paul, MN 

2007
Josephine Lutz Rollins Endowment, University of Minnesota, Minneapolis, MN  

2006
Josephine Lutz Rollins Endowment, University of Minnesota, Minneapolis, MN

References

1975 births
Living people
African-American women artists
Hispanic and Latino American women in the arts
21st-century American women artists
American artists of Mexican descent
Northwestern University faculty
Artists from Chicago
People from Sterling, Illinois
Illinois State Redbirds women's track and field athletes
21st-century American painters
American abstract artists
Abstract painters
Painters from Illinois
American women painters